The 1978–79 season was Clydebank's thirteenth season after being elected to the Scottish Football League. They competed in Scottish League Division One where they finished 4th. They also competed in the Scottish League Cup and Scottish Cup.

Results

Division 1

Final League table

Scottish League Cup

Scottish Cup

References

 

Clydebank
Clydebank F.C. (1965) seasons